Louis F. Knoll (died 2004) was an American Baptist missionary who taught Christian Ethics at the Andhra Christian Theological College, Hyderabad, affiliated with the Senate of Serampore College (University).

Robert Eric Frykenberg, Professor Emeritus of History & South Asian Studies at the University of Wisconsin, Madison writes that Louis F. Knoll believed that the British Rule in India was a major obstacle to the spread of Christianity in India.

Leadership

India
Knoll was the co-founder of the Andhra Christian Theological College, Hyderabad.  Samavesam of Telugu Baptist Churches ran their seminary in Ramayapatnam.  At first in 1967, the B. D. section of the Ramayapatnam Baptist Theological College, of which he was the Principal, was made to be situated in the same campus of Andhra Christian Theological College before it was fully integrated into the Andhra Christian Theological College in 1972 through an Act of Integration performed by Louis F. Knoll and then acting Principal William P. Peery. Talathoti Punnaiah who underwent a 1-year spirituality course as an Aspirant at the Ramayapatnam Baptist Theological Seminary affirms the fact that it was Knoll as President of the Ramayapatnam Seminary who integrated the graduate section of the Ramayapatnam Seminary into the Andhra Christian Theological College.

The Mennonite Brethren Mission also sought Knoll to consolidate its organizational structure In 1978, when the Telugu movie Karunamayudu was released, the movie acknowledged the contribution of Knoll as a financial adviser displayed during the opening titles.

Overseas
After Knoll left India, he served as Vice President of American Baptist Seminary of the West from 1978 to 1985.

Writings
 1951 – The Abrahamic covenant in the Light of History
 1959 – The Role of the Depressed Classes in Andhra Pradesh
 1967 – Now We are Together
 1968 – Population Trends and the Mission of the Church in Andhra Pradesh
 1971 – State and Religions in British India: 1814 to 1865
 1975 - A Christian understanding of Hinduism (in Telugu)

Studies
After pursuing doctoral studies at the Graduate Theological Union, Berkeley, California, Knoll was awarded the doctoral degree in 1971.  His doctoral thesis is preserved in microfilm and kept at the Nehru Memorial Museum and Library in New Delhi.

University academic
Knoll became a member of the Council of Senate of Serampore College (University) in 1966, a position in which he continued until his resignation in 1986.  In 1972, Knoll became the Master of the University.

Further reading

References
Notes

Baptist missionaries in India
Editors of Christian publications
Baptist ministers from the United States
2004 deaths
University of California, Berkeley alumni
Founders of academic institutions
Year of birth missing
Academic staff of the Senate of Serampore College (University)
Baptist missionaries from the United States
Missionary educators
American expatriates in India